The Middle Rio Grande AVA is an American Viticultural Area (AVA) with a wine grape heritage dating back to 1629. Located in New Mexico, it is part of American wine’s larger New Mexico wine region. The region is located from Santa Fe to the bosque of the Rio Grande, centering around the Albuquerque metropolitan area. It was officially designated as an AVA in 1988.

The AVA encompasses  of land in a narrow strip along the Rio Grande valley from Santa Fe to Belen, just south of Albuquerque. The climate is semi-arid, with warm days and cool nights. Sub-freezing temperatures occur in the winter.
A variety of Vitis vinifera and French hybrid grapes are grown. New Mexico State University has conducted viticultural research in test vineyards in the Middle Rio Grande Valley at the Los Lunas Agricultural Science Center.

See also
 New Mexico wine

References

External links
Middle Rio Grande Valley Wineries AmericanWineryGuide.com 

American Viticultural Areas
New Mexico wine
Rio Grande
Geography of Bernalillo County, New Mexico
Geography of Santa Fe County, New Mexico
Geography of Valencia County, New Mexico
Tourist attractions in Bernalillo County, New Mexico
Tourist attractions in Santa Fe County, New Mexico
Tourist attractions in Valencia County, New Mexico
1988 establishments in New Mexico